Roy Allen Corzine, Sr. (December 22, 1882 – June 2, 1957) was an American farmer and politician.

Biography
Corzine was born in Stonington, Illinois and attended public schools in Stonington. He attended the University of Illinois and took agriculture courses. Corzine previously worked as a farmer. Corzine served on the board of education for the Stonington Community High School. He went on to serve in the Illinois House of Representatives from 1927 to 1933 and was a  Republican. Corzine died at St. Vincent's Hospital in Taylorville, Illinois after suffering from a long illness. His grandson, Jon Corzine, is a businessman who served as Governor of New Jersey and in the United States Senate.

Notes

External links

1882 births
1957 deaths
People from Christian County, Illinois
Corzine family
University of Illinois College of Agriculture, Consumer, and Environmental Sciences alumni
Farmers from Illinois
School board members in Illinois
Republican Party members of the Illinois House of Representatives
20th-century American politicians